John Hull Mollenkopf (born March 16, 1946) is an American political scientist, sociologist, and professor. He is recognized for his analyses of US urban politics conducted in the latter part of the twentieth century, contributions to progressive debates and expert observations frequently sought out by the media.  

Mollenkopf is a professor of political science and sociology, as well as director of the Center of Urban Research at City University of New York. He has published both research and several books. He has also been a visiting scholar at Russell Sage Foundation.  He attended Harvard University for his MA and PhD.

References

1946 births
Living people
American political scientists
American sociologists
City University of New York faculty
CUNY School of Labor and Urban Studies faculty
Stanford University faculty
Graduate Center, CUNY faculty
American political writers
Harvard University alumni